Kampong Prieng is a khum (commune) of Sangkae District in Battambang Province in north-western Cambodia.

Villages

 Sambok Ak
 Sala Trav
 Kach Roteh
 Thmei
 Os Tuk
 Kbal Thnal

References

Communes of Battambang province
Sangkae District